The Pittsfield Hillies were an Eastern League (Class A) baseball team from 1919 to 1930. They were League Champions in 1919 and 1921.

Their home field was at Wahconah Park, Pittsfield, Massachusetts.

1905
The Pittsfield Hillies was a professional minor league baseball team based in Pittsfield, Massachusetts which played in the Hudson River League. The team from Saugerties, New York moved to Pittsfield on July 8, 1905 and resumed play as the Hillies. They finished with a 13-49 record and folded on July 25 of that year.

Future Major League Hillies

Cliff Brady (1919–20)
Paddy Smith (1920)
Charlie Hargreaves (1921–1922)
Bob Barrett (1923)
Joe Batchelder (1923, 1926)
Si Rosenthal (1923)
Ed Taylor (1923)
Clay Van Alstyne (1923–1924)
Earl Webb (1923–1924)
Chick Autry (1924)
Hal Goldsmith (1924)
Mule Haas (1924)
Ike Kamp (1924)
Hunter Lane (1924)
Mose Solomon, the "Rabbi of Swat" (1924)
Art Mills (1924–1926)
Joe Benes (1925)
Bill Cronin (1926)
Paul Richards (1926)
Charlie Bates (1927)
Joe Cascarella (1927–1928)
Augie Walsh (1927)
Jack Burns (1928)
Ed Connolly (1928–1929)
George Loepp (1928)
John Shea (1928–1929)
Joe Cicero (1929)
Ed Durham (1929)
Frank Mulroney (1929)
Owen Kahn (1930)

Hillies with previous Major League experience

Joe Birmingham (1919–1920)
Mickey Devine (1919)
Gary Fortune (1919)
Jack Hammond (1919–1921)
Bobby Messenger (1919–1920)
Ty Pickup (1919–1920)
Johnny Tillman (1919–1923)
Lew Wendell (1919)
Frank Kelliher (1920)
Colonel Snover (1920–1925)
Bill McCorry (1921–1923)
Al Pierotti (1921–1922)
Ernie Neitzke (1922)
Danny Silva (1922)
Eddie Zimmerman (1922)
Neal Ball (1923)
Chick Gagnon (1923)
Hal Leathers (1923)
Bunny Roser (1923)
Art Wilson (1923)
Mike Wilson (1923)
Jimmy Esmond (1924)
Waddy Macphee (1924–1925)
Horace Milan (1924, 1926)
Mose Solomon (1924)
Red Torphy (1924–1925)
Shano Collins (1925, 1928)
Lefty Jamerson (1925–1926)
Tom Sullivan (1925)
Augie Swentor (1925)
Rowdy Elliott (1926)
Ken Jones (1926)
Sam Mayer (1926, 1929)
John Perrin (1926)
Red Sheridan (1926–1928)
Ed Sperber (1926)
Dan Woodman (1926)
Ed Baecht (1927)
Harry Baldwin (1927–1928)
Ed Miller (1927)
Frank Parkinson (1927–1928)
Joe Smith (1927)
Red Smith (1927)
Denny Sothern (1927)
Lefty Taber (1927)
Mule Watson (1927)
Frank Bennett (1928)
Herb Bradley (1928–1929)
Ralph Head (1928)
Red Shea (1928)
Charlie Small (1928–1930)
Harry Wilke (1928–1930)
Casper Asbjornson (1929)
Frank Bushey (1928–1929)
Freddie Moncewicz (1929)
José Rodríguez (1929–1930)
Pat Simmons (1929–1930)
Carl Sumner (1929)
Hod Lisenbee (1929)
Maurice Archdeacon (1930)
Jim Bishop (1930)
Ray Dobens (1930)
Bob Emmerich (1930)

References 

info on the Hillies
Hillies rosters

1919 establishments in Massachusetts
1930 disestablishments in Massachusetts
Baseball teams established in 1919
Baseball teams disestablished in 1930
Defunct baseball teams in Massachusetts
Defunct Eastern League (1938–present) teams
Baseball teams in Pittsfield, Massachusetts
Professional baseball teams in Massachusetts